Carex bermudiana, the Bermuda sedge, is a sedge endemic to the islands of Bermuda. It is found on damp forest floors and in peatmarshes and has become extremely rare. The Bermuda sedge was listed on the IUCN Red List of Threatened Species in November 2014 with Endangered status. This species is listed on the Bermuda Protected Species Act.

References

Flora of Bermuda
bermudiana
Plants described in 1883